John Albert McCaffrey (April 12, 1893 — April 15, 1955) was a Canadian ice hockey defenceman who played seven seasons in the National Hockey League for the Toronto St. Pats, Toronto Maple Leafs, Pittsburgh Pirates and Montreal Canadiens.

McCaffrey won a Stanley Cup in 1930 with the Montreal Canadiens. He played in 22 of 44 regular season for Montreal during the 1930–31 NHL season.

Prior to joining the NHL, McCaffrey played eight seasons of senior hockey in the Ontario Hockey Association, including four with the Toronto Granites, winning two Allan Cups in 1922 and 1923. By virtue of playing for the reigning senior amateur champions, McCaffrey and the Granites represented Canada at the 1924 Winter Olympics in Chamonix, France. He scored 20 goals in five games as the Canadians dominated the tournament, winning the gold medal.

McCaffrey was born in Lockton, Albion Township, Peel County, Ontario in 1893 but is erroneously listed in numerous resources as being from Chesley. and died in Toronto in 1955.

Career statistics

Regular season and playoffs

International

References

External links

1893 births
1955 deaths
Canadian expatriate ice hockey players in the United States
Canadian ice hockey defencemen
Ice hockey people from Ontario
Ice hockey players at the 1924 Winter Olympics
Medalists at the 1924 Winter Olympics
Montreal Canadiens players
Olympic gold medalists for Canada
Olympic ice hockey players of Canada
Olympic medalists in ice hockey
Ontario Hockey Association Senior A League (1890–1979) players
People from Bruce County
Philadelphia Arrows players
Pittsburgh Pirates (NHL) players
Providence Reds players
Stanley Cup champions
Toronto Maple Leafs players
Toronto St. Pats players